Andrasta is a submarine design concept announced by the French shipbuilder DCNS in 2008. DCNS advertising material for the ship concept, in a PDF document with a date-time stamp of 19 October 2008, includes information and digital illustrations that reveal the torpedo tube configuration and other details. The draught of the proposed submarine is apparent from the numbered depth markings shown on the hull in one of the illustrations. It is designed for anti-submarine and anti-surface warfare, as well as intelligence gathering and special operations.

This design evolved into the Scorpène 1000.

References

Submarine classes
Proposed ships